George Huntley (c. 1512 – 31 December 1580) was the member of Parliament for Cricklade in the parliament of 1555.

References 

Members of the Parliament of England (pre-1707) for Cricklade
English MPs 1555
English justices of the peace
Sheriffs in the United Kingdom
English courtiers
1510s births
1580s deaths
Year of birth uncertain
Court of Henry VIII